Muncie is an incorporated city and the seat of Delaware County, Indiana. Previously known as Buckongahelas Town, named after the legendary Delaware Chief. The United States Census for 2020 reported the city's population was 65,194. It is the principal city of the Muncie metropolitan statistical area, which has a population of 117,671.

The Lenape (Delaware) people, led by Buckongahelas arrived in the area in the 1790s, founding several villages, including one known as Munsee Town, along the White River. The trading post, renamed Muncietown, was selected as the Delaware County seat and platted in 1827. Its name was officially shortened to Muncie in 1845 and incorporated as a city in 1865. Muncie developed as a manufacturing and industrial center, especially after the Indiana gas boom of the 1880s. It is home to Ball State University. As a result of the Middletown studies, sociological research that was first conducted in the 1920s, Muncie is said to be one of the most studied United States cities of its size.

History

Early settlement
The area was first settled in the 1790s by the Lenape (Delaware) people, who were forced west from their tribal lands in the Mid-Atlantic region (all of New Jersey, southeastern New York, eastern Pennsylvania, and northern Delaware) to new lands in present-day Ohio and eastern Indiana. The Lenape founded several towns along the White River, including Munsee Town, near the site of present-day Muncie.

Contrary to popular legend, the city's early name of Munsee Town is derived from the "Munsee" clan of Lenape people, the white settlers' name for a group of Native Americans whose village was once situated along the White River. There is no evidence that a mythological Chief Munsee ever existed. ("Munsee" means a member of or one of their languages.)

In 1818, the area's native tribes ceded their lands to the federal government under the terms of the Treaty of St. Mary's and agreed to move farther west by 1821. New settlers began to arrive in what became Delaware County, Indiana, about 1820, shortly before the area's public lands were formally opened for purchase. The small trading village of Munsee Town, renamed Muncietown, was selected as the Delaware County seat and platted in 1827. On January 13, 1845, Indiana's governor signed legislation passed by the Indiana General Assembly to shorten the town's name to Muncie. Soon, a network of roads connected Muncie to nearby towns, adjacent counties, and to other parts of Indiana. The Indianapolis and Bellefontaine Railroad, the first to arrive in Muncie in 1852, provided the town and the surrounding area with access to larger markets for its agricultural production, as well as a faster means of transporting people and goods into and out of the area.

Muncie incorporated as a town on December 6, 1854, and became an incorporated city in 1865. John Brady was elected as the city's first mayor. Muncie's early utility companies also date to the mid-1860s, including the city's waterworks, which was established in 1865.

After the American Civil War, two factors helped Muncie attract new commercial and industrial development: the arrival of additional railroads from the late 1890s to the early 1900s and the discovery of abundant supplies of natural gas in the area. Prior to the discovery of nearby natural-gas wells and the beginning of the gas boom in Muncie in 1886, the region was primarily an agricultural area, with Muncie serving as the commercial trading center for local farmers.

Industrial and civic development

The Indiana gas boom of the 1880s ushered in a new era of prosperity to Muncie. Abundant supplies of natural gas attracted new businesses, industries, and additional residents to the city. Although agriculture continued to be an economic factor in the region, industry dominated the city's development for the next 100 years. One of the major manufacturers that arrived early in the city's gas-boom period was the Ball Brothers Glass Manufacturing Company, which was renamed the Ball Corporation in 1969. The Ball brothers, who were searching for a new site for their glass manufacturing business that was closer to an abundant natural-gas supply, built a new glass-making foundry in Muncie, beginning its glass production on March 1, 1888. In 1889 the company relocated its metal manufacturing operations to Muncie.

In addition to several other glass factories, Muncie attracted iron and steel mills. Kitselman Steel & Wire Company was the largest employer in Indiana in 1900 with 11,000 employees; it later became Indiana Steel & Wire. Others included Republic Iron and Steel Company and the Midland Steel Company. (Midland became Inland Steel Company and later moved to Gary, Indiana.) Indiana Bridge Company was also a major employer. By the time the natural gas supply from the Trenton Gas Field had significantly declined and the gas boom ended in Indiana around 1910, Muncie was well established as an industrial town and a commercial center for east-central Indiana, especially with several railroad lines connecting it to larger cities and the arrival of automobile industry manufacturing after 1900.
  
Numerous civic developments also occurred as a result of the city's growth during the 1870s, 1880s, and 1890s, when Muncie citizens built a new city hall, a new public library, and a new high school. The city's gasworks also began operations in the late 1870s. The Muncie Star was founded in 1899 and the Muncie Evening Press was founded in 1905. A new public library, which was a Carnegie library project, was dedicated on January 1, 1904, and served as the main branch of the city's public library system.

The forerunner to Ball State University also arrived in the early twentieth century. Eastern Indiana Normal School opened 1899, but it closed after two years. Several subsequent efforts to establish a private college in Muncie during the late nineteenth and early twentieth centuries also failed, but one proved to be very successful. After the Ball brothers bought the school property and its vacant buildings and donated them to the State of Indiana, the Indiana State Normal School, Eastern Division, the forerunner to Ball State University, opened in 1918. It was named Ball Teachers College in 1922, Ball State Teachers College in 1929, and Ball State University in 1965.

Beginning in the late nineteenth century, in tandem with the gas boom, Muncie developed an active cultural arts community, which included music and art clubs, women's clubs, self-improvements clubs, and other social clubs. Hoosier artist J. Ottis Adams, who came to Muncie in 1876, later formed an art school in the city with fellow artist, William Forsyth. Although their school closed with a year or two, other art groups were established, most notably the Art Students' League (1892) and the Muncie Art Association (1905).

By the early twentieth century several railroads served Muncie, which helped to establish the city as a transportation hub. The Cincinnati, Richmond and Muncie Railroad (later known as the Chesapeake and Ohio Railway) reached Muncie in 1903. The Chicago, Indiana, and Eastern Railroad (acquired by a subsidiary of the Pennsylvania Railroad system) and the Chicago and Southeastern (sometimes called the Central Indiana Railroad) also served the city. In addition to the railroads, Muncie's roads connected to nearby towns and an electric interurban system, which arrived in the early 1900s, linked it to smaller towns and larger cities, including Indianapolis and Fort Wayne, Indiana, and Dayton, Ohio.

With the arrival of the auto manufacturing and the related auto parts industry after the turn of the twentieth century, Muncie's industrial and commercial development increased, along with its population growth. During World War I local manufacturers joined others around the county in converting their factories to production of war material. In the 1920s Muncie continued its rise as an automobile-manufacturing center, primarily due to its heavy industry and skilled labor force. During this time, the community also became a center of Ku Klux Klan activity. Muncie's Klan membership was estimated at 3,500 in the early 1920s. Scandals within the Klan's leadership, divisions among its members, and some violent confrontations with their opponents damaged the organization's reputation. Increasing hostility toward the Klan's political activities, beliefs, and values also divided the Muncie community, before its popularity and membership significantly declined by the end of the decade.

Muncie residents also made it through the challenges of the Great Depression, with the Ball brothers continuing their role as major benefactors to the community by donating funds for construction of new facilities at Ball State and Ball Memorial Hospital. (The hospital, which opened in 1929, later affiliated with Indiana University Health.) The Works Progress Administration (WPA) also provided jobs such as road grading, city sewer improvements, and bridge construction.

Middletown studies

In the 1920s, Robert and Helen Lynd led a team of sociologists in a study of a typical middle-American community. The Lynds chose Muncie as the locale for their field research, although they never specifically identified it as "Middletown" the fictional name of the town in their study. Muncie received national attention after the publication of their book, Middletown: A Study in Contemporary American Culture (1929). The Lynds returned to Muncie to re-observe the community during the Depression, which resulted in a sequel, Middletown in Transition: A Study in Cultural Conflicts (1937). The Lynds' Middletown study, which was funded by the Rockefeler Institute of Social and Religious Research, was intended to study "the interwoven trends that are the life of a small American city."

The Lynds were only the first to conduct a series of studies in Muncie. The National Science Foundation funded a third major study that resulted in two books by Theodore Caplow, Middletown Families (1982) and All Faithful People (1983). Caplow returned to Muncie in 1998 to begin another study, Middletown IV, which became part of a Public Broadcasting Service documentary titled "The First Measured Century", released in December 2000. The Ball State Center for Middletown Studies continues to survey and analyze social change in Muncie. A database of Middletown surveys conducted between 1978 and 1997 is available online from the Association of Religion Data Archives (ARDA). Due to the extensive information collected from the Middletown studies during the twentieth century, Muncie is said to be one of the most studied cities of its size in the United States.

In addition to being called a "typical American city", as the result of the Middletown studies, Muncie is known as Magic City or Magic Muncie, as well as the Friendly City.

World War II to the present

During World War II the city's manufacturers once again turned their efforts to wartime production. Ball State and Muncie's airport also trained pilots for the U.S. Navy. The postwar era was another period of expansion for Muncie, with continued growth and development of industries, construction of new homes, schools, and businesses. A population boom brought further development, especially from 1946 to 1965.

Since the 1950s and 1960s Muncie has continued as an education center in the state and emerged as a regional health center. As enrollment at Ball State increased, new buildings were erected on the college's campus. Ball Memorial Hospital also expanded its facilities. However, by the 1960s, industrial trends had shifted. Beginning in the 1970s several manufacturing plants closed or moved elsewhere, while others adapted to industrial changes and remained in Muncie. Ball Corporation, for example, closed its Muncie glass manufacturing facilities in 1962 and its corporate headquarters relocated to Broomfield, Colorado in 1998. Muncie was also home to other manufacturing operations, including Warner Gear (a division of BorgWarner), Delco Remy, General Motors, Ontario Corporation, A. E. Boyce Company, and Westinghouse Electric, among others.

In 2017, the Muncie Community Schools system was declared a "distressed political subdivision", and put in direct control of the state government. In 2018, the school district was reformed and a new board was appointed by Ball State's Board of Trustees.

In 2021, following the Fall of Kabul and the U.S. withdrawal from the War in Afghanistan, several Afghan refugees arrived in Camp Atterbury, near Edinburgh, Indiana. Munsonian members of the nationwide organization, Afghan Women's and Kids' Education and Necessities (AWAKEN) formed the Muncie Afghan Refugee Resettlement Committee (MARRC) to help Afghan refugees resettle in Muncie. Afghan refugees began arriving in Muncie soon after.

African-American history

The black population in Muncie grew from 3.7% in 1890, to 5.6% in 1920, and to 13.2% in 2013. In 1920, the city had the fifth-largest black population in Indiana with 2,054 black residents. Two major parades were held by the Ku Klux Klan in 1922 and 1924, with the mayor and police chief attending the 1924 parade. The first black police officer in Muncie was hired in 1899, and the city's first black police chief took his position in 1995. The first black teacher in the city was hired in 1952, and the first black principal was appointed in 1956.

According to Hurley Goodall, the first serious black political candidate in Muncie was Wayne Brooks, who ran for the Republican nomination for mayor in 1934. Ray Armstrong was elected as the first black member of the city council in 1951 and Alice McIntosh was elected as the first black female member of the city council in 1983. Goodall was the first black person elected to the city's school board and later to represent the area in the state house. No other black person served Muncie's school board after Goodall's election to the state house until Carl Kizer Jr.'s appointment to the board in 1993. The school board became majority black for the first time after the 2008 election.

Government

The county government is a constitutional body and is granted specific powers by the Constitution of Indiana, and by the Indiana Code.

As a second class city in Indiana (pop. 35,000 to 599,999), Muncie is governed by a Mayor and a nine-member city council as well as a city clerk and city judge. City elections for Mayor, city council, city judge, and city clerk are held in odd years immediately preceding presidential elections (2015, 2019, etc.). The current mayor is Dan Ridenour, a Republican first elected in 2019. The current city clerk is Belinda Munson and the current city judge is Amanda Dunnuck. The nine-members of the city council are divided into six members elected from districts and three members elected at-large. The current members of the city council are:

District 1: Jeff Green (R)
District 2: Jeff Robinson (D)
District 3: Brandon Garrett (D)
District 4: Isaac Miller (R)
District 5: Jerry Dishman (D)
District 6: Roger Overbey (D)
At-Large: Aaron Clark (R)
At-Large: Troy Ingram (R)
At-Large: Roza Selvey (R)

Geography

Climate
Muncie has a humid continental climate (Köppen climate classification Dfa) experiencing four distinct seasons.

Neighborhoods 
Muncie has over 50 identified neighborhoods.

Demographics

2020 census
As of the census of 2020, there were 65,194 people, 26,692 households and 6,179 families residing in the city. The racial makeup of the city was 78.0% White, 11.6% African American, 0.3% Native American or Alaskan Native, 1.5% Asian, 0.1% Native Hawaiian or Pacific Islander, 2.1% from other races and 6.5% were from two or more races. Hispanic and Latino of any race were 4.2% of the population.

There were 26,692 households, of which 16.2% had children under the age of 18 living with them, 29.6% were married couples living together, 35.7% had a female householder with no husband present, 26.2% had a male householder with no wife present, and 8.5% were non-families. 61.9% of all households were made up of individuals. The average household size was 2.44 and the average family size was 3.09.

50.1% of the population had never been married, 29.6% were married and not separated, 5.7% were widowed, 13.1% were divorced, and 1.6% were separated.

The median age of the city was 28.8. 4.4% of residents were under the age of 5, 16.2% were under 18 years, 83.8% were age 18 or older, and 14.0% were age 65 or older. 5.8% of the population were veterans.

The most common language spoken at home was English with 95.5% speaking it at home, 1.7% spoke Spanish at home, 1.4% spoke an Asian or Pacific Islander language at home, 1.3% spoke another Indo-European language at home, and 0.1% spoke some other language. 2.6% of the population were foreign born.

The median household income in Muncie was $34,602, 38.4% less than the median average for the state of Indiana. 30.2% of the population were in poverty, including 32.6% of residents under the age of 18. The poverty rate for the town was 17.3% higher than that of the state. 18.6% of the population was disabled and 8.7% had no healthcare coverage. 34.3% of the population had attained a high school or equivalent degree, 19.7% had attended college but received no degree, 8.9% had attained an Associate's degree or higher, 14.0% had attained a Bachelor's degree or higher, and 11.6% had a graduate or professional degree. 20.4% had no degree. 53.2% of Muncie residents were employed, working a mean of 34.0 hours per week.

2010 census
As of the census of 2010, there were 70,085 people, 27,722 households, and 13,928 families residing in the city. The racial makeup of the city was 84.0% White, 10.9% African American, 0.3% Native American, 1.2% Asian, 0.1% Pacific Islander, 0.8% from other races, and 2.8% from two or more races. Hispanic or Latino of any race were 2.3% of the population.

There were 27,722 households, of which 23.9% had children under the age of 18 living with them, 31.5% were married couples living together, 14.1% had a female householder with no husband present, 4.6% had a male householder with no wife present, and 49.8% were non-families. 35.2% of all households were made up of individuals, and 10.9% had someone living alone who was 65 years of age or older. The average household size was 2.22 and the average family size was 2.85.

The median age in the city was 28.1 years. 17.8% of residents were under the age of 18; 27.5% were between the ages of 18 and 24; 21.4% were from 25 to 44; 20.2% were from 45 to 64; and 13% were 65 years of age or older. The gender makeup of the city was 47.5% male and 52.5% female.

2000 census
As of the census of 2000, there were 67,430 people, 27,322 households, and 14,589 families residing in the city. The racial makeup of the city was 83.72% White, 12.97% African American, 0.27% Native American, 0.79% Asian, 0.09% Pacific Islander, 0.67% from other races, and 1.49% from two or more races. Hispanic or Latino of any race were 1.44% of the population.

There were 27,322 households, out of which 23.7% had children under the age of 18 living with them, 36.4% were married couples living together, 13.0% had a female householder with no husband present, and 46.6% were non-families. 34.1% of all households were made up of individuals, and 11.8% had someone living alone who was 65 years of age or older. The average household size was 2.24 and the average family size was 2.86.

In the city, the age distribution of the population shows 19.8% under the age of 18, 24.6% from 18 to 24, 24.2% from 25 to 44, 18.3% from 45 to 64, and 13.2% who were 65 years of age or older. The median age was 29 years. For every 100 females, there were 89.9 males. For every 100 females age 18 and over, there were 86.5 males.

The median income for a household in the city was $26,613, and the median income for a family was $36,398. Males had a median income of $30,445 versus $21,872 for females. The per capita income for the city was $15,814. About 14.3% of families and 23.1% of the population were below the poverty line, including 24.2% of those under age 18 and 9.7% of those age 65 or over.

Economy 

From its early days as a regional trading center for the surrounding agricultural community to its first wave of industrial development brought on by the Indiana gas boom in the mid-1880s, Muncie has retained its ties to an industrial economy, and to a lesser extent its agricultural roots. In addition, the arrival of the forerunner to Ball State in the early twentieth century contributed to Muncie's development as an educational center, while Ball Memorial Hospital, established in 1929, led to the city's reputation as a healthcare center for east-central Indiana.

Muncie's major industrial development included glass manufacturing, iron and steel mills, and automobile manufacturing and auto parts factories. Among its early major employers was the Ball Corporation, established by the Ball brothers of Buffalo, New York, who opened a glass factory in Muncie in 1888. Other notable manufacturers in addition to the Ball Corporation with operations in Muncie have included BorgWarner, The Broderick Company (aformer division of Harsco), Dayton-Walther Corporation, Delco Remy, General Motors, New Venture Gear, Hemingray Glass Company, Ontario Corporation, A. E. Boyce Company, Indiana Steel and Wire, and Westinghouse Electric.

Changing industrial trends caused shifts in the city's economic development. As in many mid-sized cities in the Rust Belt, deindustrialization, which began in the 1960s, impacted Muncie's economy. Several manufacturing plants closed or moved elsewhere. From 2001 to 2011, Muncie lost thousands of jobs as the city continued transitioning from a blue-collar workforce to a white-collar service economy primarily based on health care, education, and retail.

Muncie has attracted some new manufacturers, while older factories have been converted to other industrial uses. In 2009, Muncie became the U.S. headquarters for Brevini Wind, an Italian-based company that manufactures gearboxes for wind turbines. In 2011, locomotive maker Progress Rail (a subsidiary of Caterpillar Inc) opened in a former Westinghouse facility that had been vacant since 1998.

The local economy is a controversial topic among Munsonians. While many older unemployed or underemployed residents strongly identify with the manufacturing identity of the city, newer residents identify with the city's shift towards educational and health services. Contention is greatest among residents living in the once-industrialized sections of the city's south side, as much of the economic growth over that last few decades has taken place on Muncie's north side. The city also struggles to retain college graduates. Despite Ball State's presence, only 32.2 percent of Delaware County's working-age adults (ages 25–64) hold a two-year or four-year college degree, which is below the national average.

The first decade of the 21st century saw a cultural shift toward local businesses and economic empowerment, boosted by the Muncie Downtown Development Partnership and the residents, patrons, and business owners of the downtown community. In 2007, Muncie was rated the most affordable college town in America by real estate company Coldwell Banker. In 2015, Forbes ranked Muncie 27th among small places for business and careers and 18th for cost of doing business. First Merchants Corporation is based in Muncie, and the first Scotty's Brewhouse location opened in the city in 1996.

, the largest employers in the city were:

Culture

The David Owsley Museum of Art collection, which includes over 11,000 works, has been in the Fine Arts Building on the Ball State University campus since 1935. The Horizon Convention Center, located downtown, offers  of exhibition space and houses the Muncie Children's Museum. The city also has a large group of independent art galleries.

Three of the city's largest performing arts centers belong to Ball State University: the 3,581-seat Emens Auditorium, the 600-seat Sursa Performance Hall, and the 410-seat University Theatre. Downtown performing arts spaces include the Muncie Civic Theatre and Canan Commons, an outdoor amphitheater and greenspace that opened in 2011. In addition, the Muncie Ballet and the Muncie Symphony Orchestra are prominent in the city's arts community.

Minnetrista Cultural Center, just north of downtown along the White River, is a cultural heritage museum featuring exhibits and programs focusing on nature, east-central Indiana history, and art. The  campus includes historic homes that were once owned by the Ball family, themed gardens, outdoor sculptures, and a portion of the White River Greenway. The Cardinal Greenway, Indiana's longest rail trail project, stretches  from Richmond to Marion, Indiana. Designated a National Recreation Trail in 2003, it is part of the American Discovery Trail. The Ball State campus is home to Christy Woods, an  arboretum, three greenhouses, and the Wheeler Orchid Collection and Species Bank.

Muncie's music scene has been home to such acts as Brazil, Everything, Now!, and Archer Avenue (ex-Margot & the Nuclear So and So's). Muncie MusicFest. Muncie also has a network of craft beer enthusiasts.

Sports

Muncie is home to the NCAA Division I Ball State Cardinals which is a member of the Mid-American Conference. Notable sports include football (played at Scheumann Stadium), men's basketball (played at John E. Worthen Arena), and baseball (played at Ball Diamond).

Muncie was once home to the Muncie Flyers, also known as the Congerville Flyers, the city's professional football team from 1905 to 1925. The Muncie team was one of the eleven charter members of National Football League (NFL). It played in the league in 1920 and 1921.

Muncie was also home to the Muncie Flyers, a minor league hockey team. The team played in the International Hockey League for a single season in 1948–1949.

Muncie Central High School is home to the Muncie Fieldhouse, the fifth-largest high school gym in the United States.

Education

Higher education
 
Ball State University
Ivy Tech Community College
Scuba Educators International

Elementary schools
Burris Laboratory School
East Washington Academy
Grissom Elementary
Heritage Hall Christian School
Hoosier Academy Muncie
Longfellow Elementary
North View Elementary
South View Elementary
St. Michael Elementary School
West View Elementary

Middle schools
Burris Laboratory School
Heritage Hall Christian School
Hoosier Academy Muncie
Northside Middle School
Southside Middle School

High schools
Burris Laboratory School
Heritage Hall Christian School
Indiana Academy for Science, Mathematics, and Humanities
Muncie Area Career Center
Muncie Central High School

Libraries

Carnegie Library
Kennedy Library
Maring–Hunt Library
Connection Corner
Shafer Library (Ivy Tech)
Bracken Library (Ball State)

Media

Newspapers 
 The Star Press

Television 
As part of the Indianapolis market, Muncie receives Indianapolis' network affiliates. East Central Indiana's PBS member station, WIPB, is located in Muncie. The Joy of Painting was filmed at WIPB.

Radio stations 
 WCRD
 WERK
 WMXQ
 WLBC
 WMUN
 WNAP-FM
 WNAP
 WBST
 WXXC

Transportation

Air 
 Delaware County Regional Airport (not a commercial airport)

Highways 
  Interstate 69
  U.S. Route 35
  State Road 3
  State Road 32
  State Road 67
  State Road 332

Rail 

Until 1986 Muncie's Wysor Street Depot at 700 East Wysor Street was a passenger train stop on the Chicago-Cincinnati service of Amtrak's Cardinal. Until 1971, Muncie Union Station was a stop on the Penn Central's Indianapolis-Cleveland on the route of the New York Central's former Southwestern Limited (St. Louis-New York City) and Cleveland Special (Indianapolis-Cleveland).

Freight service is provided by CSX and Norfolk Southern. Railroad equipment supplier Progress Rail opened a manufacturing facility in 2011.

Mass transit 
Muncie Indiana Transit System (MITS) provides 14 fixed bus routes daily, except Sundays.

Sister cities 
Muncie has five sister cities, as designated by Sister Cities International:
 Changhua, Taiwan
 Deyang, China
 Isparta, Turkey
 Taraz, Kazakhstan
 Zhuji, China

Notable natives and residents 

Note: This list does not include Ball State University graduates. Please see List of Ball State University alumni for notable alumni.

General
 Jolly Blackburn, cartoonist, creator of the comic strip Knights of the Dinner Table, writer for and creator of the magazine Shadis and Alderac Entertainment Group. Current partner with Kenzer & Company.
 Ray Boltz, Contemporary Christian musical artist
 Minnie Thomas Boyce, writer, poet, playwright, lived in Muncie
 Ball Brothers, industrialists and philanthropists, founders of the Ball Corporation
 Francis Focer Brown, American impressionist painter that also served as the head of the Fine Arts Department at the David Owsley Museum of Art at Ball State University.
 Angelin Chang, Grammy Award-winning classical pianist
 Trevor Chowning, pop artist and former Hollywood talent agent/producer
 Benjamin Victor Cohen, key figure in the administrations of Presidents Franklin D. Roosevelt and Harry S. Truman
 Mary Jane Croft, actress
 George R. Dale, editor of Muncie Post-Democrat (1920–1936), gained national attention speaking out against the Ku Klux Klan
 Jim Davis, cartoonist, creator of the comic strip Garfield
 Bertha Fry, supercentarian, third oldest person on earth at time of death, November 14, 2007 (113 years)
 Maybelle Goodlander, photographer
 Ida Husted Harper, suffragette and writer 
 Emily Kimbrough, author and magazine editor, Our Hearts Were Young and Gay and How Dear to My Heart
 F. William Lawvere, mathematician and philosopher known for his seminal contributions to category theory and mathematical philosophy
 Cheryl Anne Lorance, artist
 E. S. L. Thompson (1848-1944), writer 
 Anna Augusta Truitt (1837–1920), philanthropist, temperance reformer, essayist
 Gregory H. Williams, Lawyer and Author of Life on the Color Line: The True Story of a White Boy Who Discovered He Was Black; 27th President of the University of Cincinnati, and the 11th President of the City College of New York

Sports

 Cliff Baldwin, football player
 Ron Bonham, former All-American Muncie Central basketball standout, Cincinnati Bearcats, Indiana Pacers, and NBA champion Boston Celtics
 Zora G. Clevenger, coach in College Football Hall of Fame
 Buck Crouse, professional baseball player, Chicago White Sox
 Bill Dinwiddie, professional basketball player
 Dave Duerson, All-American defensive back for Notre Dame; played 11 seasons for NFL's Chicago Bears, New York Giants, and Phoenix Cardinals
 Hod Eller, professional baseball player for 1919 World Series champion Cincinnati Reds
 Brandon Gorin, professional football player, New England Patriots, Arizona Cardinals, St. Louis Rams, and Denver Broncos
 Jeremy Hazelbaker, professional baseball player, Arizona Diamondbacks
 Ryan Kerrigan, Purdue University football standout defensive end, professional football player with Philadelphia Eagles Football Team
 Richie Lewis, professional baseball player, Baltimore Orioles, Florida Marlins, Detroit Tigers, Oakland Athletics, and Cincinnati Reds
 Adam Lind, professional baseball player, Seattle Mariners
 Matt Painter, Purdue University men's basketball head coach
 John Paul Jr., Indy Car driver
 Frank Thomas, Notre Dame quarterback and roommate of George "The Gipper" Gipp; head football coach of University of Alabama 1931–46, won two national championships
 Bonzi Wells, former Muncie Central High School and Ball State University standout, professional basketball player, Houston Rockets, Memphis Grizzlies, New Orleans Hornets, Portland Trail Blazers, and Sacramento Kings

See also

 Academy of Model Aeronautics
 Armed & Famous
 List of public art in Muncie, Indiana
 Muncie Mall
 Muncie SM465 transmission

References

External links

 City of Muncie, Indiana website
 Muncie Chamber of Commerce
 
 
 LIFE Magazine May 10, 1937, "Middletown-Muncie", pages 15–25, ("the Picture Essay"), at Google Books.
 Digitized archival collections related to Muncie and its history (Ball State University Digital Media Repository)
 Hemingray Glass Company (Muncie, IN and Covington, KY) 

 
Cities in Indiana
Cities in Delaware County, Indiana
County seats in Indiana
Populated places established in 1827
1827 establishments in Indiana